SIPS or Sips may refer to any of the following:

Secure Session Initiation Protocol transported over TCP/TLS
Side Impact Protection System
SIPS surgery, a type of bariatric surgery
Smart Inorganic Polymers
Spina iliaca posterior superior
Structural insulated panel
Super-IPS TFT LCD panel type, a more advanced version of the IPS LCD Panels. Developed by Hitachi Ltd.
Systemically Important Payment Systems
Society for the Improvement of Psychological Science
Chris Lovasz, Twitch Streamer and member of The Yogscast